Moïse Gorendiawé (11 July 1938 – 3 April 2001) was a New Caledonian professional footballer who played as a defensive midfielder or defender. He spent his career playing in Corsica.

References

1938 births
2001 deaths
New Caledonian footballers
French footballers
Association football midfielders
Association football defenders
AC Ajaccio players
Gazélec Ajaccio players
Ligue 1 players